Stephen Bull was an English lawyer.

Stephen Bull may also refer to:

Steve Bull, English footballer
Stephen Bull Fine Arts Elementary School

See also
Bull baronets
Bull (surname)